Levantina rechingeri is a species of gastropod belonging to the family Helicidae.

The species is found in Greece.

References

Helicidae